Xiangshuiosteus wui is an extinct monospecific genus of brachythoracid arthrodire placoderm from the Late Emsian stage of the Early Devonian epoch, discovered in Wuding County of Yunnan province, China.  It has recently been reassessed as a dunkleosteid.

Etymology
The generic name literally translates as "(Pinyin:Xiāngshuǐ) + bone," but actually refers to Xiangshui Valley, the district in Wuding County where the holotype was found. The specific name honors Wu Baosheng, the gentleman who provided the holotype to Wang Junqing, the species' describer.

Specimen and taxonomy
X. wui is known from a flattened, "Buddhist cap" shaped skull roof. The skull roof is strongly reminiscent of those of coccosteids, but also has anatomical features otherwise diagnostic of buchanosteids. This mix of anatomy lead its describer, Wang Junqing, to suggest that X. wui is the sister taxon of Coccosteidae, and represents a transitional form between Coccosteidae and Buchanosteidae.

A 2013 reappraisal of Kiangyousteus and several other eubrachythoracid arthrodire genera by You-An Zhu and Min Zhu lead to the conclusion that X. wui not only does not represent a transitional form between coccosteids and buchanosteids, but is actually a dunkleosteid closely related to the Gogo Reef Eastmanosteus calliaspis (which is, in turn, implied to be not of the genus Eastmanosteus). The cladogram below from the 2013 Zhu & Zhu study shows the placement of Xiangshuiosteus within Dunkleosteidae.

However, the subsequent 2016 Zhu et al. study using a larger morphological dataset recovered Xiangshuiosteus well outside of Dunkleosteoidea and even Eubrachythoraci, more in-line with Wang's original 1992 phylogenetic assessment of Xiangshuiosteus, as shown in the cladogram below:

See also
Jiuchengia a coccosteid found in the same formation.

Notes

References

Dunkleosteidae
Placoderms of Asia
Paleontology in Yunnan
Prehistoric animals of China
Fossil taxa described in 1992